Little Hills 158B is an Indian reserve of the Lac La Ronge Indian Band in Saskatchewan. It is 8 miles southwest of La Ronge, and on the south-east shore of Bigstone Lake.

References

Indian reserves in Saskatchewan
Division No. 18, Saskatchewan